Rhythm and blues (R&B) is a popular music genre.

Rhythm and blues or R&B may also refer to:

Music
 New Orleans rhythm and blues, a musical style that arose in the mid-20th century
 Contemporary R&B, a musical style that arose in the late 1970s
 Rhythm and Blues Foundation, an American nonprofit organization for the preservation of rhythm and blues music
 R&B Records, a 1980s British record label

Albums
 Rhythm & Blues (Buddy Guy album), 2013
 Rhythm & Blues (Robert Palmer album), 1999
 Rhythm and Blues (Garou album), 2012
 Rhythm and Blues (World Saxophone Quartet album), 1989

Songs
 "R&B", by Ty Dolla Sign from Campaign, 2016
 "R'n'B", by Goldie Lookin Chain from Safe as Fuck, 2005
 "Rhythm & Blues", by the Head and the Heart from Signs of Light, 2016 
 "Rhythm and Blues", by Twothirtyeight from You Should Be Living, 2002

Other uses
 Rhythm and Blues (professional wrestling), a 1988–1991 WWF tag team
 Rhythm & Blues (TV series), a 1992 American sitcom

See also
 The Rhythm and the Blues, a 2009 album by Jimmy Barnes
 RNB (disambiguation)